Talod is a town and a municipality in Sabarkantha district in the Indian state of Gujarat.

Demographics 
 India census, Talod had a population of 17,472. Males constitute 52% of the population and females 48%. Talod has an average literacy rate of 69%, higher than the national average of 59.5%: male literacy is 76%, and female literacy is 60%. In Talod, 13% of the population is under 6 years of age.

History
The Ranasan State, was a small princely state belonging to the Mahi Kantha Agency had its capital in Ranasan village of Talod municipality during the era of British India.

References 

Cities and towns in Sabarkantha district